The Corinthia Hotel Tripoli, originally known as the Corinthia Bab Africa Hotel, is a five star skyscraper hotel in Tripoli, Libya. It is located in the city center, near the central business district. It is run by the Maltese Corinthia Hotels International CHI plc hotels management company. The hotel was opened in 2003 by Prime Minister, Shukri Ghanem [More information required].

2015 terror attack

On 27 January 2015 ten people, including five foreigners from France, Italy, Turkey, United Kingdom and the American Crucible LLC security contractor David Berry, were killed by a gun attack. Prior to this attack six people were injured in a car bomb explosion near the Hotel. A group of militants allegedly affiliated with the Islamic State of Iraq and the Levant claimed responsibility for the attack. The group, which called itself Islamic State in Tripoli Province, stated that they perpetrated the attack to avenge the death of Abu Anas al-Libi.

See also

References

External links

Corinthia Hotel Tripoli official website
Corinthia Hotel in the Emporis database

Hotels in Tripoli, Libya
Skyscraper hotels
Hotel buildings completed in 2003
Hotels established in 2003
Skyscrapers in Africa